The 1994 Kansas State Wildcats football team represented Kansas State University in the 1994 NCAA Division I-A football season.  The team's head football coach was Bill Snyder.  The Wildcats played their home games in KSU Stadium.  1994 saw the Wildcats finish with a record of 9–3, and a 5–2 record in Big Eight Conference play.  The season ended with a loss against Boston College in the 1994 Aloha Bowl.

Schedule

Roster

Game summaries

Minnesota

Nebraska

at Colorado

vs. Boston College (Aloha Bowl)

Team players in the NFL

References

Kansas State
Kansas State Wildcats football seasons
Kansas State Wildcats footbal